Roxane Bridget Kernohan (née Furman; March 20, 1960 – February 5, 1993) was a Canadian actress. She is best known for her role in the 1988 sequel Critters 2: The Main Course.

Career
Kernohan began her career in 1988 when she appeared in the low-budget slasher film Fatal Pulse.  She appeared in several other films during 1988 including Roger Corman remake Not of This Earth,  the post apocalyptic action film She-Wolves of the Wasteland and the film for which she is best known, Critters 2: The Main Course, where she plays "Lee", the bounty hunter.  The same year she appeared in the documentary The Decline of the Western Civilization Part II: The Metal Years. In 1989, she appeared in the action film Tango & Cash and the Playboy documentary Playboy: Sexy Lingerie. In 1990 she starred in Angel III: The Final Chapter, and her final film came in 1991 when she played herself in the direct-to-video film Scream Queen Hot Tub Party.

Death
In 1993, Kernohan died of injuries following a car accident.

Filmography
 Fatal Pulse (1988) – Ann
 Critters 2: The Main Course (1988) – Lee
 Not of This Earth (1988) – Lead Hooker
 She-Wolves of the Wasteland (1988) – Meda
 The Decline of Western Civilization Part II: The Metal Years (1988), (documentary)
 Tango & Cash (1989) – Dressing Room Girl
 Playboy: Sexy Lingerie (1989), (documentary)
 Playboy: Party Jokes (1989), (Herself)
 LA Guns - Sex Action music video (1989), (Herself)
 Bold and the Beautiful(S3 E61) (1989), (Diana)
 Angel III: The Final Chapter (1990) – White Hooker
 Scream Queen Hot Tub Party (1991) – Herself

References

External links
 
 

1960 births
1993 deaths
Canadian film actresses
Road incident deaths in California
20th-century Canadian actresses